Money Game is a 2015 Chinese comedy film directed by Huang Wei. It was released on January 23, 2015.

Cast
Lee Seung-hyun
Zhang Lanxin
Liu Hua
Hu Xia
Zhang Yishan
Bao Jianfeng
Cao YunJin
Li Chengfeng
Xie Jinyuyin
Mimi Chu
Cheung Kwok Keung 
Crystal Zhang
Zhang Dali
Guan Ling

Reception
By January 23, the film had earned  at the Chinese box office.

References

2015 comedy films
Chinese comedy films
2010s Mandarin-language films